SFNB may refer to:
 Seattle-First National Bank
 Security First Network Bank